Yvette Dugay (born Audrey Lee Pearlman; June 24, 1932 – October 14, 1986) was an American actress. She was often credited as Yvette Duguay.

Early years
The daughter of Mr. and Mrs. William Pearlman, she began acting at the age of six months, and continued her career well into adulthood, proving to be one of the few child stars of the time to maintain a successful career. 

Although Duguay’s family reportedly originated in Marseilles, France, as wine merchants, she was recorded to have been born in Paterson, New Jersey. Her family decided to move to Hollywood when Duguay was two years old, where she lived for her entire life. Dugay graduated from Hollywood High School in 1950.

Career 

Director Arthur Lubin once described Dugay as "a rare actress with a bottomless well of emotion." Her filmography spans 40 years. Her career began when she was only six months old, modeling for baby talcum powder. She made her Broadway debut at age seven in a play starring Walter Huston.  Duguay began spelling her name Dugay around the age of 12, about the time that she landed the role of a young Maria Montez in Ali Baba and the Forty Thieves (1944).  She was typecast as being able to play exotic-looking characters from an early age.

Universal Pictures signed Duguay in July, 1951 when at age nineteen, earning her a weekly salary of $1,250. She portrayed a Native American woman, Starfire, in the Western film Cattle Queen of Montana (1954) that starred Barbara Stanwyck and future President of the United States Ronald Reagan.   Cattle Queen turned out to be one of her most recognizable roles, but Duguay also portrayed a Native American character, Minnehaha, in another film, Hiawatha (1952), in which she starred opposite Vince Edwards.

Her other credits include The Great Caruso (1951) starring Mario Lanza, the film noir The People Against O'Hara (1951), opposite Spencer Tracy and James Arness, The Cimarron Kid (1952), Francis Covers the Big Town (1953), and "The Zorro" as MarianaThe Domino Kid (1957).

She also played a Native American woman in an episode of Bronco (1959), a Warner Bros. television series starring Ty Hardin.  Her last role was playing the Lone Woman in 1960 on the series Cheyenne.

Notes

References

External links

 Yvette Duguay.  Internet Movie Database. Retrieved on 2 November 2014.
 Yvette Dugay: The Private Life and Times of Yvette Dugay Glamour Girls. Retrieved on 30 October 2014.
Picture of Yvette Duguay Listal. Retrieved on 2 November 2014.
"Yvette Dugay - About This Person" NYTimes.com.  Retrieved on 2 November 2014.

1932 births
1986 deaths
American film actresses
20th-century American actresses